Fang Jingqi (born 17 January 1993) is a Chinese footballer who currently plays for Tianjin Jinmen Tiger in the Chinese Super League.

Club career
Fang Jingqi started his football career with China League Two side Dongguan Nancheng in 2011. Playing as the backup goalkeeper to Yang Chao, Fang made seven appearances in the group stage as Dongguan Nancheng finished the fourth place in the south group and entered the playoffs stage. He did not appear in any of the playoff matches as Dongguan lost to Chongqing F.C. 3–0 on aggregate in the semifinals which meant they failed to promote to China League One directly. The team then lost to Fujian Smart Hero 2–0 in the third place playoff match and failed to enter the relegation playoff. Although Fang became the first choice goalkeeper of the team in 2012, he played just ten league matches and two cup matches as he spent most of his time with the Chinese under-20 national team.

Fang transferred to Chinese Super League giant Guangzhou Evergrande along with his teammates Liao Lisheng, Yang Chaosheng, Li Weixin, Hu Weiwei, Zhang Xingbo and Wang Rui in November 2012. On 16 February 2014, he made his debut for the club against Guizhou Renhe in a 1–0 loss in the 2014 Chinese FA Super Cup. He made another appearance for the club on 13 May 2015, in the 2–1 away defeat against Xinjiang Tianshan Leopard in the third round of 2015 Chinese FA Cup. He came on substitution in 92nd minute when starting goalkeeper Li Shuai was sent off, but could not stop opponent's winner penalty in the stoppage time.

Fang transferred to China League One newcomer Meizhou Meixian Techand on 28 February 2018. On 11 April 2018, he made his debut in a 1–0 away defeat against Yanbian Beiguo in the third round of 2018 Chinese FA Cup.

On 7 February 2019, Fang was loaned to first-tier club Tianjin Tianhai for the 2019 season. On 1 March 2019, he made his Super League debut in the season's opener match against his former club Guangzhou Evergrande. He scored an own goal in the match which ended up with a 3–0 defeat.

Career statistics
.

Honours

Club
Guangzhou Evergrande
Chinese Super League: 2014, 2015, 2017
Chinese FA Cup: 2016
Chinese FA Super Cup: 2017

References

External links
 

1993 births
Living people
People from Guiyang
Chinese footballers
Footballers from Guizhou
Guangdong South China Tiger F.C. players
Guangzhou F.C. players
Tianjin Tianhai F.C. players
Taizhou Yuanda F.C. players
Chinese Super League players
China League One players
China League Two players
Association football goalkeepers
Footballers at the 2014 Asian Games
Asian Games competitors for China